Kasunko is a chiefdom in Koinadugu District of Sierra Leone with a population of 20,357. Its principal town is Fadugu.

References

Chiefdoms of Sierra Leone
Northern Province, Sierra Leone